Coccinella novemnotata, the nine-spotted ladybug or nine-spotted lady beetle, is a species of ladybug native to North America.

The nine-spotted ladybug has been the state insect of New York since 1989, though its numbers have declined as the numbers of introduced species such as the seven-spotted ladybug and Asian lady beetle have increased. It was for some time thought extinct in New York, so in 2006, the state considered designating the pink spotted ladybug as state insect instead, but the bill did not pass the Senate. In 2006 the nine-spotted ladybug was rediscovered in Virginia (the first East Coast sighting in 14 years). In 2011, about 20 of these ladybugs were found on a farm in Amagansett, New York, the first such sighting in the state since 1982.

Identification
The nine-spotted ladybug can be identified by the presence of four black spots on each of its elytra, a single spot split between the elytra, and a black suture between the elytra. Its pronotum is black, with two connected white marks at the front of its head.

Range
C. novemnotata has historically been native in North America to the United States and southern Canada. C. novemnotata has become rare across its native range. It was once the most commonly collected coccinellid in the northeastern United States until the early 1990s with the last individuals collected for Maryland, Pennsylvania, and Delaware between 1986 and 1988, and another collection in Maine in 1992. Another specimen would not be collected in northeastern states until 14 years later in 2006. More recently, C. novemnotata has only been collected sporadically in the Midwest and west coast of the United States.

Decline
Invasive coccinellid species such as Harmonia axyridis are sometimes associated with the decline of C. novemnotata, but the species was becoming rare in some areas before the introduction and population increase of invasive lady beetles. Changing agricultural habitats have also been considered as another possible explanation, but recent studies do not suggest a correlation between C. novemnotata densities and land-use change.

Notes

Coccinellidae
Beetles of North America
Beetles described in 1794
Taxa named by Johann Friedrich Wilhelm Herbst
Symbols of New York (state)